Kulick is surname. Notable people with the surname include: 

 Barry Kulick, film producer
 Bob Kulick (born 1950-2020), guitarist
 Bruce Kulick (born 1953), guitarist
 Don Kulick (born 1960), anthropologist
 Josh Kulick, drummer
 Kelly Kulick (born 1977), bowler

See also
 Kulich (surname)